The Disembodied is an American 1957 horror film directed by Walter Grauman and starring Paul Burke, Allison Hayes, John Wengraf, Eugenia Paul, and Robert Christopher.  It was released by Allied Artists on a double bill with From Hell It Came. The film is the Grauman's first directing job.

Plot
Searching for adventures, a photographer visits a remote tropical village where he meets a local married couple in the person of Dr. Metz and his strange native wife, Tonda, who is fond of Voodoo rituals and turns out to be a dark cult leader.

Cast

Paul Burke as Tom Maxwell
Allison Hayes as Tonda Metz
John Wengraf as Dr. Carl Metz
Eugenia Paul as Mara, wife of Suba
Joel Marston as Norman Adams
Robert Christopher as Joe Lawson
Dean Fredericks as Suba
A.E. Ukonu as Lead Voodoo Drummer
Paul Thompson as Gogi
Otis Greene as Kabar

References

External links

1957 films
1957 horror films
American horror films
Allied Artists films
Films directed by Walter Grauman
1950s English-language films
1950s American films